El Hassan El-Abbassi (born 13 April 1984) is a Moroccan-born long-distance runner who competes internationally for Bahrain. He was the gold medallist in the 10,000 metres at the 2014 Asian Games and the 2015 Asian Athletics Championships. He has a personal best of 27:25.02 minutes for that distance. El-Abbassi is currently suspended from competition due to an Athletics Integrity Unit investigation following the Tokyo 2020 Olympic Games.

Career
El-Abbassi initially ran in middle-distance events but a move up to longer distances brought him his first successes. In his debut over the distance, he set a personal best of 62:53 minutes at the 2011 Marrakesh Half Marathon. His first race abroad followed in February and he was the surprise winner at the 
Eurocross cross country meet. An outing at the Corrida de Langueux 10K run brought him fourth place. He had three further outings over the half marathon distance that year and was in the top three each time: he was runner-up in Zwolle, set a personal best of 61:13 minutes for third at the Route du Vin Half Marathon, and was under 62 minutes again to win at the Zhuhai Half Marathon in China that December. He failed to progress much further in 2012, with a podium finish at the Yangzhou Half Marathon and fourth at the Philadelphia Distance Run being his best races abroad. However, he did win his first national title over 10,000 metres with a personal best time of 28:12.40 minutes.

El-Abbassi established himself among the world's road running elite in 2013. In January he set a new best of 61:09 minutes over the half marathon in Marrakesh. His best run that year was in an event almost half that distance: at the Ottawa 10K in Canada he won in a lifetime best of 27:37 minutes, ranking sixth globally that year as a result. He also had a sub-28-minute race at the Casablanca 10K one week later.

He decided to start running for Bahrain and formally requested a transfer of allegiance in August 2013. He became eligible to compete for his new nation in July 2014. He set two track bests in the 2014 season: first a time of 13:33.95 minutes for the 500 metres at the Rabat Meeting then a 27:32.96-minute best over the 10,000 m at the Prefontaine Classic. The latter time ranked him eleventh in the world that year and the second fastest non-Kenyan after world-leader Galen Rupp.

 His international debut for Bahrain was at the 2014 Asian Games. Running in the 10,000 m he held the lead and beat Suguru Osako to the line to win the gold medal – maintaining Bahrain's dominance for a third straight edition.

Following partipation in the marathon event at the Tokyo 2020 Olympic Games, on 18 August 2021 the Athletics Integrity Unit announced that El-Abbassi had been provisionally suspended from competition after returning an adverse analytical finding for a homologous blood transfusion.

International competitions

Personal bests
1500 metres – 3:49.2h min (2009)
3000 metres – 8:15.05 min (2009)
5000 metres – 13:19.36 min (2016)        
10000 metres – 27:25.02 min (2015)
10K run – 27:26 min (2016)
Half marathon – 59:27 min (2018)
Marathon – 2:04:43 min (2018)

References

External links

Living people
1984 births
Moroccan male long-distance runners
Bahraini male long-distance runners
Asian Games medalists in athletics (track and field)
Asian Games gold medalists for Bahrain
Asian Games silver medalists for Bahrain
Athletes (track and field) at the 2014 Asian Games
Athletes (track and field) at the 2018 Asian Games
Moroccan emigrants to Bahrain
World Athletics Championships athletes for Bahrain
Athletes (track and field) at the 2016 Summer Olympics
Olympic athletes of Bahrain
Medalists at the 2014 Asian Games
Medalists at the 2018 Asian Games
Naturalized citizens of Bahrain
Athletes (track and field) at the 2020 Summer Olympics